Eberhard Hermann Erich Zeidler (6 October 1940 in Leipzig, Germany – 18 November 2016 ibid) was a German mathematician, who worked primarily in the field of non-linear functional analysis.

Life and work 
After attending the Leipzig  Eberhard Zeidler began studying mathematics at the University of Leipzig in 1959. In 1961, he was exmatriculated because of critical statements, and was forced to work as a transport worker and absolve his military service in the East-German's NVA. In 1964, he was allowed to continue his studies. In 1967, he received his Dr. rer. nat. (PhD) with his work "" under .

In 1970, he was appointed to habilitation and became a lecturer for analysis at the University of Leipzig. From 1974 to 1996 he was full professor for analysis.

In the winter semester of 1979–1980, Eberhard Zeidler was a visiting professor at the University of Wisconsin–Madison (USA).

From 1992 to 1996, he was head of the DFG research group on "" (Nonlinear functional analysis and its applications), and from 1992 to 2000 he was a member of the scientific advisory board of the Mathematisches Forschungsinstitut Oberwolfach.

In 1996, Eberhard Zeidler became the first managing director of the Max Planck Institute for Mathematics in the Sciences when it was founded in Leipzig. In 2003, he gave up the management, but remained director. He retired in October 2007.

Eberhard Zeidler has been a member of the German Academy of Sciences Leopoldina since 1994. Also, he was one of the founding members of the Foundation Board and the Foundation Advisory Board of the Stiftung Benedictus Gotthelf Teubner.

Awards and honors 
 2005: International symposium of the Max Planck Institute for Mathematics in the Natural Sciences and the University of Leipzig on the occasion of the 65th birthday of Eberhard Zeidler
 2006: 
 2014-02-21: Stiftung Benedictus Gotthelf Teubner Science Prize of the Teubner Foundation for the Promotion of Mathematical Sciences

Publications 
 . Dissertation. Universität Leipzig, Leipzig, 1967.
 . Habilitationsschrift. Universität Leipzig, Leipzig, 1970. Als Festschrift . Akademie-Verlag, Berlin, 1971.
 . 3 Volumes. Teubner, Leipzig.
 Volume 1: . 1976. 3rd ed., 1980.
 Volume 2: . 1977. 3rd ed., 1981.
 Volume 3: . 1978. 2nd ed., 1982.
 English edition: . Springer, New York, 1986–1997.
 with Günter Grosche (ed.): . . Teubner, Stuttgart. 
 Volume 1: 1996, ISBN 3-8154-2001-6.
 Volume 2: . 2003, ISBN 3-519-21008-8.
 English edition: Oxford Users' Guide to Mathematics. Oxford University Press, Oxford, New York, 2004, ISBN 0-19-850763-1.
 Applied Functional Analysis. Springer, New York, 1995.
 Volume 1: Applications to Mathematical Physics. ISBN 0-387-94442-7.
 Volume 2: Main Principles and Their Applications. ISBN 0-387-94422-2.
 with Hans-Peter Gittel, Jerzy Kijowski: The relativistic dynamics of the combined particle field system in nonlinear renormalized electrodynamics. Max-Planck-Institut für Mathematik in den Naturwissenschaften Leipzig, Leipzig, 1997.
 Quantum Field Theory. Springer, Berlin.
 Volume 1: Basics in Mathematics and Physics. 2006, ISBN 3-540-34762-3.
 Volume 2: Quantum Electrodynamics. 2008, ISBN 978-3-540-85376-3.
 Volume 3: Gauge Theory. 2011, ISBN 978-3-642-22420-1.
 Volume 4–6: unfinished.

See also 
 Bronshtein and Semendyayev

References

Further reading 
 
 Zeidler, Eberhard. In: Helmut Müller-Enbergs (ed.): "Wer war Wer in der DDR?: Ein Lexikon ostdeutscher Biographien." Berlin: , 2010, Vol. 2: M–Z, pp. 1467–1468.
 
 
  
 University Archive Leipzig: Professorendatenbank. UAL PA 1995.
 Bundesarchiv Berlin-Lichterfelde: Aktenbestand MHF der DDR. DR/3–B Archivsignatur 1922
 
 Zeidler, Eberhard. In: "Kürschners Deutscher Gelehrten-Kalender 1992" (16. ed.). Berlin: Walter de Gruyter, 1992 (16) Vol. 3: S–Z, p. 4195.
 Zeidler, Eberhard. "Berufung von Professoren neuen Rechts an die Universität Leipzig mit Wirkung vom 1. Juni 1992". In: Journal der Universität Leipzig, Issue 4/1992, pp. 3–4.
 Schulte, Volker. "Eberhard Zeidler zum 65. - Mathematik macht bescheiden." In: Journal Universität Leipzig, 6/2005, p. 28.
 Girlich, Hans-Joachim; Schlote, Karl-Heinz: "Mathematik." In: Ulrich von Hehl, Uwe John, Manfred Rudersdorf (eds.): "Geschichte der Universität Leipzig 1409–2009", Vol. 4:  "Fakultäten, Institute, Zentrale Einrichtungen" (2. half-volume). Leipzig: Universitätsverlag 2009, pp. 1073–1097.

External links 
  Speech held at the Carl Friedrich von Siemens Foundation on 1998-07-14 [45:12]
 
 

20th-century German mathematicians
21st-century German mathematicians
Functional analysts
Leipzig University alumni
Academic staff of Leipzig University
Members of the German Academy of Sciences Leopoldina
Max Planck Society people
Max Planck Institute directors